is an annual single-elimination tournament created and promoted by the Japanese professional wrestling promotion World Wonder Ring Stardom. The event has been held since 2015 and aired domestically on Tokyo MX, Fighting TV Samurai and Nippon TV, and later as an internet pay-per-view on Stardom's streaming service Stardom World.

The main gimmick of the tournament is that the winner is being granted a wish, which usually turns up to be a championship match of their choice. Just as the real life fairytale of Cinderella depicting a girl who achieves fame after being obscure, the winner of the tournament transits from "neglected" to "famous", eventually moving up to a championship scene.

Events
As of 2022, there have been a total of eight events. The first one was presented under the name of "Cinderella Champions Fiesta", and later on the series began being known simply as the "Cinderella Tournament". Until 2021, the event used to be a one-day pay-per-view but later switched to a multi-day event.

Stats

List of winners
{| class="wikitable sortable"
|-
! rowspan="2" | Year
! colspan="4" | Tournament
! colspan="4" | Aftermath
|-
! Winner
! Runner-up
! Timeswon
! No. ofentrants
! Challenged for
! Match
! Result
! Ref
|-
|2015 || Mayu Iwatani || Koguma || 1 || 14 || rowspan=3|World of Stardom Championship || vs. Kairi Hojo at Stardom Gold May 2015 ||  || 
|-
|2016 || Mayu Iwatani || Hiroyo Matsumoto || 2 || rowspan=5|16 || vs. Io Shirai at Stardom Gold May 2016 ||  || 
|-
|2017 || Toni Storm || Mayu Iwatani || rowspan=6|1 || vs. Io Shirai at Stardom Gold May 2017 ||  || 
|-
|2018 || Momo Watanabe || Bea Priestley || rowspan=5|Wonder of Stardom Championship || vs. Io Shirai at Stardom Gold Star ||  || 
|-
|2019 || Arisa Hoshiki || Konami || vs. Momo Watanabe at Stardom Gold May 2019 ||  || 
|-
|2020 || Giulia || Natsuko Tora || vs. Tam Nakano at Cinderella Summer in Tokyo ||  || 
|-
|2021 || Saya Kamitani || Maika || 20 || vs. Tam Nakano at Yokohama Dream Cinderella 2021 in Summer ||  || 
|-
|2022 || Mirai || Koguma || 31 || vs. Saya Kamitani at Stardom Flashing Champions ||  || 
|-
|2023 || TBD || TBD || TBD ||  36 || rowspan=3|TBD

Record

All-time participants list

As of the 2022 edition, there have been a total of 68 participants who entered the tournament. Mayu Iwatani is the only wrestler who won the competition on two separate occasions (as well as the only one to win on two consecutive occasions) and shares the record for the most appearances with Momo Watanabe at 7. Koguma is the only competitor to be a two-time runner up. Mayu Iwatani, Giulia and Toni Storm won the tournament while holding other titles, respective the Artist of Stardom Championship (Giulia), the SWA World Championship (Storm) and the Goddesses of Stardom Championship (Iwatani).

Legend
C – Champion
F – Finals
SF – Semi-finals
QF – Quarter-finals
R2 – Round 2
R1 – Round 1
{|class="wikitable sortable"
|-
!Wrestler
!Victories
!Apps
!Bestresult
|-
|Mayu Iwatani || 2 || 7 || style="background: gold" rowspan=7|C 
|-
| Momo Watanabe || 1 || 7
|-
| Giulia || 1 || 3 
|-
| Saya Kamitani || 1 || 3 
|-
| Arisa Hoshiki || 1 || 1 
|-
| Mirai || 1 || 1 
|-
| Toni Storm || 1 || 1 
|-
| Konami || 0 || 5 || F
|-
| Tam Nakano || 0 || 5 || SF
|-
| Jungle Kyona || 0 || 5 || R2
|-
| Natsuko Tora || 0 || 4 || F
|-
| Hazuki/HZK || 0 || 4 || SF
|-
| Saki Kashima || 0 || 4(5) || QF
|-
| AZM || 0 || 4 || R2
|-
| Hana Kimura  || 0 || 4 || R2
|-
| Kagetsu || 0 || 4 || R2
|-
| Kaori Yoneyama/Fukigen Death || 0 || 4 || R1
|-
| Starlight Kid || 0 || 4 || QF
|-
| Maika || 0 || 3 || F
|-
| Kairi Hojo || 0 || 3 || QF
|-
| Syuri || 0 || 3 || SF
|-
| Utami Hayashishita || 0 || 3 || R2
|-
| Koguma || 0 || 2 || F
|-
| Himeka || 0 || 2 || SF
|-
| Natsupoi || 0 || 2 || SF
|-
| Bea Priestley || 0 || 2 || QF
|-
| Unagi Sayaka || 0 || 2 || QF
|-
| Io Shirai || 0 || 2 || R2
|-
| Kyoko Kimura || 0 || 2 || R2
|-
| Hanan || 0 || 2 || R1
|-
| Hiromi Mimura || 0 || 2 || R1
|-
| Kris Wolf || 0 || 2 || R1
|-
| Mina Shirakawa || 0 || 2 || R1
|-
| Ruaka || 0 || 2 || R1
|-
| Sumire Natsu || 0 || 2 || R1
|-
| Hiroyo Matsumoto || 0 || 1 || SF
|-
| Saya Iida || 0 || 1 || QF
|-
| Brandi Rhodes || 0 || 1 || R2
|-
| Chelsea || 0 || 1 || R2 
|-
| Jessicka Havok || 0 || 1 || R2
|-
| Mai Sakurai || 0 || 1 || R2
|-
| Queen Maya || 0 || 1 || R2
|-
| Santana Garrett || 0 || 1 || R2
|-
| Star Fire || 0 || 1 || R2
|-
| Tessa Blanchard || 0 || 1 || R2
|-
| Alex Lee || 0 || 1 || R1
|-
| Alpha Female || 0 || 1 || R1
|- 
| Ami Sourei || 0 || 1 || R1
|-
| Andras Miyagi || 0 || 1 || R1
|-
| Candy Floss || 0 || 1 || R1
|-
| Chardonnay || 0 || 1 || R1
|-
| Diosa Atenea || 0 || 1 || R1
|-
| Haruka Kato || 0 || 1 || R1
|-
| Hatsuhinode Kamen || 0 || 1 || R1
|-
| Hetzza || 0 || 1 || R1
|-
| Hina || 0 || 1 || R1
|-
| Jamie Hayter || 0 || 1 || R1
|-
| Lady C || 0 || 1 || R1
|-
| Miyu Amasaki || 0 || 1 || R1
|-
| Momo Kohgo || 0 || 1 || R1
|-
| Martina || 0 || 1 || R1
|-
| Rebel || 0 || 1 || R1
|-
| Rebel Kel || 0 || 1 || R1
|- 
| Rina || 0 || 1 || R1
|-
| Saori Anou || 0 || 1 || R1
|-
| Thekla || 0 || 1 || R1
|-
| Thunder Rosa || 0 || 1 || R1
|-
| Waka Tsukiyama || 0 || 1 || R1

Notes

References

External links
Page Stardom World

World Wonder Ring Stardom
World Wonder Ring Stardom shows
Women's professional wrestling shows
Women's professional wrestling tournaments